American Candy is the fifth studio album by American rock band The Maine, released on March 31, 2015, through 8123 Records. The album debuted at number 37 on the Billboard 200. The album sold 15,000 copies in its first week.

Background and composition
The Maine were teasing a new album in summer 2014, and then proceeded to announce that they would be writing new material in Heber, Arizona. Recording took place at Joshua Tree in California with Colby Wedgeworth acting as the producer. He also engineered and mixed the sessions. Recording place between November 12 and December 12. Ross Garfield was the drum technician at Drum Doctors. Tom Coyne mastered the recordings at Sterling Sound.

The album's sound has been described as alternative rock, indie rock, new wave, pop, pop rock and rock. "American Candy" was originally written for Forever Halloween. Drummer Pat Kirch explained that the song "didn't really fit" Forever Halloween, but the band revived it for American Candy "and made it fit."

Release
On January 6, 2015, the group revealed that their new album was titled American Candy, and would be released in the spring. "English Girls" was made available for streaming on February 9, and was released as a single on February 10. The song garnered more than 92,000 streams in less than 4 days on Soundcloud. On the same day, American Candy was announced for release, and the track listing and artwork was revealed. "Miles Away" was made available for streaming on March 10. The song debuted at number 16 on the iTunes Alternative Chart. "Same Suit, Different Tie" was made available for streaming on March 30. American Candy was released through 8123 Records on March 31. To help promote the release, the band released an acoustic version of "Miles Away" and did a 24-hour live stream. In April and May, the group went on a headlining North American tour with support from Real Friends, Knuckle Puck and the Technicolors. On June 1, a music video for "English Girls" was premiered via MTV which was directed by Daniel Gomes. Tyler Sharp of Alternative Press said the video features the band members "enduring an interesting night out, which is concluded with an unforeseen twist."

From late August to early October, the band went on The Free For All Tour; every show of the tour was free-of-charge. The shows took place at out-of-the-ordinary areas such as radio stations, parks and malls. Kirch explained the band wanted the tour to be "a big party and an opportunity" for fans "who can't afford to buy a ticket to come". In between the dates for the tour, the band performed intimate shows where they played American Candy in full. Kirch revealed the band "felt like it was important to do and our fans wanted to hear it". The band supported Mayday Parade in the UK and Europe in January and February 2016. In March and April, the band went on a co-headlining US tour with Mayday Parade with support from Better Off. On March 28, a music video was released for "Am I Pretty?". The band went on the 2016 edition of Warped Tour.

Critical reception

American Candy received mostly positive feedback from music critics. Mark Deming of AllMusic rated the album three and a half stars out of five, writing that it is "a polished contemporary pop sound that meshes with the band's strong but tuneful approach, and the lyrics are often thoughtful and frequently witty meditations on relationships, popular culture, and the world around us." Annie Zaleski of Alternative Press gave the album four out of five stars and writes: "American Candy is full of the classic-sounding pop-rock they do so well."

American Candy was nominated for Album Of The Year at the 2016 Alternative Press Music Awards.

Track listing
All songs written by The Maine.

"Miles Away" – 3:38
"Same Suit, Different Tie" – 3:18
"My Hair" – 3:15
"English Girls" – 3:13
"24 Floors" – 3:43
"Diet Soda Society" – 3:00
"Am I Pretty?" – 3:02
"(Un)Lost" – 3:45
"American Candy" – 3:48
"Another Night on Mars" – 4:26

Personnel
Personnel per booklet.

The Maine
 John O'Callaghan – vocals, guitar, keys
 Jared Monaco – lead guitar
 Kennedy Brock – rhythm guitar
 Garrett Nickelsen – bass
 Pat Kirch – drums

Production
 Colby Wedgeworth – producer, engineer, mixing
 Tom Coyne – mastering
 Ross Garfield – drum tech
 John O'Callaghan, Tim Kirch – art direction, design
 Dirk Mai – photography

Chart performance

Release history

References
 Citations

Sources

External links

American Candy at YouTube (streamed copy where licensed)

The Maine (band) albums
2015 albums